Bijaya Dhanurjaya Pur Sasan (also known as B.D.Pur, or previously as Tentulia Sasan) is a Census town near Bellaguntha of Ganjam district in Odisha, India. It is located 108 km towards North from District Headquarters Chhatrapur. 149 km from State capital Bhubaneswar .It is named by King Dhananjay Bhanja.

History
King Dhananjaya Bhanja (forefather of Kabi Samrat Upendra Bhanja) donated a small piece of land to a group of Brahmin so they could assist him in worshiping the deities of the kingdom, as well as to look after the medical needs of the community.

Geography and institutions
The people from roughly 15 to 20 nearby villages depend on this road for communication and market access.

The village has a degree college (Tentulia Sasan Devasthan College) established in 1981.  It has a girls high school, a co-educational high school, a M. E. school and a U.P. school.

The following temples are located in this village:
 Shri Shri Gopinath Swami Temple (where Lord Krishna and Lord Shiva (ChandraShekhar) dwell)
 Shri Shri Balunkeswar Temple
 Maa Gramadevati Temple
 Maa Ugratara Temple
 Maa Bata Mangala Temple (near Tentulia Sasana Devasthan College)

There is a United Bank of India, B.D.Pur Branch

An ancient folk drama group (Prahlada Nataka) is also based in the village.

References

External links
 Our B.D. Pur
 WikiMapia
 B.D. Pur at YahooGroup

Ganjam district
Cities and towns in Ganjam district